A genitotoxin is a poisonous toxin which damages the urinary organs or the reproductive organs. It can be due to negative side-effects of a medication, or may be caused by natural chemicals that are used in laboratories or the industry. The name derives from genus ("gender"), a word which suggests the aspects of andrology, gynaecology and urology.

The active effect of a genitotoxin is strongly dependent on the dose, the location of the intake, the speed at which it spreads and the health of the human or animal.

Genitotoxic substances
Zearaleone

See also
Mycotoxin

References 

Toxins by organ system affected